Hoyt Street may refer to the following stations of the New York City Subway in Brooklyn:

Hoyt Street (IRT Eastern Parkway Line), serving the  trains
Hoyt–Schermerhorn Streets (New York City Subway); a station complex consisting of:
Hoyt–Schermerhorn Streets (IND Fulton Street Line), serving the  trains
Hoyt–Schermerhorn Streets (IND Crosstown Line), serving the  train